William E. Macaulay Honors College, commonly referred to as Macaulay Honors College or Macaulay, is a highly selective honors college for students at the City University of New York (CUNY) system in New York City. The college awards full-tuition scholarships to all of its undergraduates (or a substantial partial scholarship to out-of-state students). For the class of 2020, there were 6,272 applicants for an enrollment of 537 students. The average high school GPA and SAT for the class of 2020 were 94.1% and 1414, respectively.
Since 2016, the college has consistently received the highest rating for a public university honors college. Macaulay students have earned more than 250 prestigious awards including 37 Fulbright Fellowships, 5 Truman Scholarships, 3 Rhodes Scholarships, and 28 National Science Foundation grants.

Founding and history
Macaulay was first conceived by Matthew Goldstein as an independent institution within the City University of New York. The aim of its creation was to increase educational standards and foster university-wide collaboration and excellence. However, support for existing honors programs at CUNY colleges amidst institutional opposition resulted in its launch in 2001 as CUNY Honors College in collaboration with a number of CUNY's senior colleges. Initially, there were five college partners: Baruch, Brooklyn, City, Hunter, and Queens Colleges. Later on, Lehman College, College of Staten Island, and John Jay College were added. Commonly known as Macaulay Honors College University Scholars Program, its first class graduated in 2005.

The founding dean of Macaulay Honors College is Laura Schor, Professor of History at Hunter College and the CUNY Graduate Center, received her PhD in Modern European History at the University of Rochester in 1974. In July 2006, Ann Kirschner, a graduate of SUNY Buffalo, UVA, and Princeton University, was appointed Dean of Macaulay Honors College. In September 2006, The City University of New York received a $30,000,000 gift from philanthropist and City College alumnus, William E. Macaulay, chairman and chief executive officer of First Reserve Corporation. It is the largest single donation in the history of CUNY and helped finance the purchase of a landmark building on the Upper West Side of Manhattan that has become the permanent home of Macaulay Honors College, and will add support to its endowment. A new governance plan, approved by the CUNY Board of Trustees in late April 2010, provided Macaulay Honors College with degree-granting authority through CUNY's Graduate Center. Beginning in Spring 2011, graduates became eligible to receive a dual degree from both their home college and Macaulay Honors College.

In August 2016, Chancellor James B. Milliken named Mary C. Pearl as dean of CUNY's Macaulay Honors College.

Academics

Program
Each Macaulay student is designated a University Scholar and receives:

A full-tuition scholarship (tuition-waiver) - Students must meet CUNY NYS residency requirements for in state tuition to receive the full tuition scholarship. Out-of-State Students receive tuition waiver in the amount of in-state tuition.
Dedicated, specialized advisors through the Macaulay Advising Program (MAP)
A NYC cultural passport card that offers free and/or discounted admission to "participating cultural institutions."

Students
Macaulay Honors College students have won numerous local and national awards, such as the Harry S. Truman Scholarship, the Rhodes Scholarship, Schwarzman Scholarship, the Intel Science Talent Search ($100,000 award), The Barry Goldwater, the Jeannette K. Watson Fellowship, Fulbright Fellowship, Bienecke Fellowship, Salk Fellowship, and the Benjamin A. Gilman International Scholarship.

Admissions
Macaulay Honors College accepts applications from high school seniors applying for the first time to be freshman immediately following their senior year. Macaulay does not accept transfer students or applicants applying for mid-term entry. The college advises applicants to research the eight CUNY senior colleges which participate in Macaulay prior to submitting an application, which is available online. Applicants to Macaulay are then considered for acceptance to the undergraduate degree program at the CUNY campus designated on their applications.

Campus
Located at 35 West 67th Street, Macaulay Honors College is half a block from Central Park and three blocks from Lincoln Center for the Performing Arts in Manhattan's Upper West Side.

Building
After building completion in 1904, 35 West 67th Street subsequently housed the Swiss Benevolent Society for numerous years. In 1999, it became known as the Steinhardt Building after undergoing extensive restoration and renovation under the direction of philanthropist Michael Steinhardt.  Following the completion of the Steinhardt Building's refurbishment, the 92nd Street Y received the building as a donation in 2001 from Steinhardt.

The Gothic revival building was purchased with the donation of the Macaulay family and underwent extensive renovations to prepare it for students and staff.  Renovations are now complete and the building is in use by the students and staff of Macaulay Honors College.

After Macaulay 
Some Macaulay alumni go on to pursue careers in major New York firms, such as BBC Worldwide Americas, Bloomberg, Google, and more. Macaulay graduates also go on to pursue graduate degrees at prestigious universities such as Harvard, Yale, Princeton, Cornell, Columbia, Caltech, Stanford, University of California, Berkeley, Duke, and Oxford.

Notable people

Alumni
 Anthony Volodkin (2007) - founder of The Hype Machine

Faculty
Current:
 Carmen Boullosa - renowned Mexican poet, novelist, and playwright, featured as a visiting professor teaching the course The Mouth: Spanish-Speaking Women Writers from the 1500s to the 1970s.
 Edwin G. Burrows - research historian, Pulitzer Prize winning-author, distinguished professor at Brooklyn College (History Department).
 Nathan Lents - scientist and author, director of the John Jay College Macaulay Program.
 David Petraeus - visiting professor at Macaulay teaching a course called The Coming North American Decades.
 Harold Varmus - Nobel-prize winning scientist, former director of National Cancer Institute and National Institute of Health, teaches the seminar Science and Society.
Ted Widmer - American historian, writer, and speechwriter who has taught seminars on Walt Whitman, democracy, and The People of New York.

References

External links 
 

 
Public honors colleges
Universities and colleges in Manhattan
Universities and colleges in New York City
Educational institutions established in 2001
Macaulay
2001 establishments in New York City